Abbas Shafiee (September 25, 1937 – June 15, 2016) was an Iranian pharmaceutical chemist. He was the president of faculty of pharmacy at Tehran University. He published more than 350 scientific articles in peer reviewed international journals.

Shafiee received his degree in Pharmacy from Tehran University in 1962, later earning a master's from Columbia University's College of Pharmaceutical Sciences in 1965, and a Ph.D. in Pharmaceutical Chemistry from the same institution in 1968.

Selected honoraria 
 National Winner of Merit, Lunsford Richardson Award for graduate research (USA), 1968
 Research Award, Tehran University, 1972
 Ministry of Higher Education award for Research, 1974
 First Degree Kharazmi Award, 1987
 Permanent Member of Iranian Academy of Medical Sciences 1990.
 Member of Iranian Academy of Science, Tehran 1991.
 Tehran University's Highest Honorary Award, 1994
 Iranian Chemical Society Year's Chemist, 1995
 His book, Chromatography and spectroscopy, was named best book of the year and received the corresponding award from the Interior Ministry in 1996 and the Ministry of Health in 1995 
 Doctor of Science (Honoris Causa), University of Colombo, Sri Lanka, 1998
 First degree Razi Award, 1998
 Second degree National Award for Research, 1999
 Best National Book of the Year, 2000

References

See also
Hassan Farsam
Ahmad Reza Dehpour
Iranian science
Intellectual movements in Iran

Iranian pharmacologists
1944 births
2016 deaths
Columbia University College of Pharmacy alumni
University of Tehran alumni
Academic staff of the University of Tehran
Recipients of the Order of Knowledge
Recipients of the Order of Research
Iranian Science and Culture Hall of Fame recipients in Medicine